Bamberton Provincial Park is a provincial park located in Mill Bay, British Columbia, Canada. The park area consists of a beach that borders on Saanich Inlet, and is connected to a camping area by several trails. The traditional name of the beach is qʷələs in the Saanich dialect. It shares its name with the now abandoned company town of Bamberton.

References 

Provincial parks of British Columbia
Greater Victoria
Protected areas established in 1960
1960 establishments in British Columbia